Peone may refer to:

 Peone, Washington, a community in the United States
 Péone, a commune in France